The H4855 Personal Role Radio (PRR) is a small UHF transmitter-receiver issued to the British Armed Forces. It is used by the British Army, Royal Marines, Royal Navy and the Royal Air Force Regiment.  The radio has a range of 500 meters, weighs 1.5 kilograms, has 256 different radio channels and a battery life of 20 hours continuous use. It allows users to communicate over short distances. Effective even through thick cover or the walls of buildings, PRR is issued to every member of an eight-strong infantry section. It is manufactured by Marconi-Selenia Communications (then Selenia Communications, Selex ES until 2015, now Leonardo new name of Finmeccanica since 2016). The PRR was originally part of the wider Bowman radio project but was hived off in October 1999 for more rapid implementation, and the first of 45,000 units formally entered service in early 2002. Operating in the 2.4 GHz band, PRR has integrated encryption but does not intercommunicate with the rest of the Bowman network, but is widely acclaimed as having revolutionised intra-squad communications and small-unit tactics.

Additional features being the ability to be re-configured in the field with 16 channels available on the selector knob and fifteen other groups of sixteen available with a simple tool. The radio operates on spread spectrum and has a good level of security being designed with LPI  (low probability of interception).    An inbuilt receiver enables the radio to be keyed remotely via a short range encoded Press To Talk switch fob, the switch being mounted on a weapon or hand grip of a military vehicle.    The switch code can be changed in the field and the radio configured to work with up to 4 different switches (useful for soldiers sharing transport such as motor cycles where the PTT switch can be handlebar mounted).  The side-mounted switch-pack is supplied with a single Transmit switch for general use and a double switch pack and auxiliary lead and connector to operate a second "Bowman" radio from the same users headset.  Multiple security switches and block outs are fitted to prevent re transmission of secure Bowman signals over the personal network.

References

External links
 
 
 

British military radio
Military radio systems